The Italian Istituto Poligrafico e Zecca dello Stato (IPZS) (State Mint and Polygraphic Institute), founded in 1928, is situated at the via Salaria 691 in Rome. As well as producing coins, passports, and postage stamps for Italy, it serves the micro-states of the Vatican City, San Marino, and the Sovereign Military Order of Malta. It also publishes books under the imprint Libreria dello Stato.
The O.C.V. (Officina Carte Valori) and traditional productions factory, the multimedial production institute and the Mint are also located in the capital. Other factories are located in Verrès, Val d'Aosta, and Foggia, Apulia.
Banknotes are produced by the Bank of Italy.

In 2002, IPZS became a public limited company (società per azioni or SpA) with the Italian Ministry of Economy and Finance (Ministero dell'Economia e delle Finanze) as sole shareholder.

History 

On 27 December 1911, the Italian mint was officially inaugurated by king Victor Emmanuel III in the seat located in via Principe Umberto, on the Esquiline. But in 1907, Victor Emmanuel founded the Scuola dell'Arte della Medaglia (SAM) ('School of the Art of Medalmaking') in the old location of the mint. The school trained new artists about carving and modelling techniques and its attendants would later manufacture real coins: it is still nowadays a unique example in the world of didactic and creative formation inside a mint.

In 1928, the Istituto Poligrafico dello Stato ('State Polygraphic Institute') was established and in 1978 acquired the mint section, under president Rosario Lanza, becoming the Istituto Poligrafico e Zecca dello Stato.

In 1982, it became the first mint to manufacture Bi-metallic coins through a patented process.

Since October 2002, the IPSZ is a società per azioni with the Italian Ministry of Economy and Finance as sole shareholder.

Functions 
IPZS prints official state publications like the Gazzetta Ufficiale, state marks and seals, postal stamps and manufactures coins. IPZS designs anti-counterfeiting and security systems for identity cards, electronic passports, driving licenses and residence permits. It manufactures vehicle registration plates and manages institutional sites and databases.

Since 2001, the CNAC (Coin National Analysis Centre) has been established in the Mint and it analyses counterfeit coins delivered by obliged subjects in Italy, San Marino and Vatican City. According to the Italian law n° 27 of 24 March 2012, CNAC has additional tasks and functions which derive from the application of the EU Regulation 1210/2010. CNAC receives coins not suitable for circulation, carries out tests using specific instruments (art. 5 of the aforesaid regulation), does the annual controls according to the article 6 of the aforesaid regulation (commas 2 and 6) and trains the personnel involved in the authentication process. It is a member of the European group of sophistication of the OLAF, headed by OLAF/ETSC (European Technical and scientific Centre) and formed by 27 European CNACs, Europol and the European Central Bank.

Managers

See also
 Banca d'Italia
 Italian Lira
 Italian passport
 Postage stamps and postal history of Italy

References

External links
Istituto Poligrafico e Zecca dello Stato 

Mints of Italy
Mint
Government agencies established in 1928
1928 establishments in Italy
Rome Q. III Pinciano
Book publishing companies of Italy